Daskal is a surname. Notable people with the surname include:

Asher Anshel Daskal (1908–1990), Israeli businessman
Atanasije Daskal, Serbian medieval chronicler and writer
Dimitrije Daskal (1660–after 1718), Montenegrin painter
Jennifer Daskal (born 1972), American lawyer
Reb Chaim Daskal (1961–2014), Israeli rabbi